The Dip is a pop, rhythm and blues band that was formed in 2013 by jazz music students at the University of Washington in Seattle. The band combines a typical pop instrumentation with a 3-part horn section. They have released three full-length albums as well as two instrumental EPs.

History
Band members Jarred Katz, Mark Hunter and Tom Eddy shared a house near the University of Washington, where they would play songs on guitar together, occasionally joined by their friend Jacob Lundgren. A trio known as the Honeynut Horns (Brennan Carter, Evan Smith, and Levi Gillis) lived across the alley and would play jazz songs on their balcony. The two groups came together to form The Dip.

The band was initially created to play house parties at the University of Washington in order to provide the band members, all jazz music students, an opportunity to play more mainstream music. They recorded an EP in their room in 2013 and played their first gig at Barboza in Seattle at the end of that summer.

In 2015 the band released their self-titled first album, then followed that up with the instrumental album Won't Be Coming Back the following year. In 2019 they released their second full-length album The Dip Delivers, which was recorded in a studio they built for themselves, and in 2020 they released a second instrumental EP The Dip Plays It Cool. In 2021 the band signed with Dualtone Records and released a new single Paddle To The Stars, followed by the full-length album Sticking With It in March 2022.

The band has played several music festivals and also embarked on longer tours, including a 2019 tour of Europe with Durand Jones & The Indications as well as a tour of Japan. Although they had to cancel a 2020 tour due to the pandemic, they are planning a 2022 tour of North America, including some dates supporting Lake Street Dive.

Members 
 Tom Eddy – lead vocals
 Jarred Katz – drums
 Mark Hunter – bass guitar
 Jacob Lundgren – lead guitar
 Brennan Carter – trumpet
 Levi Gillis – tenor saxophone
 Evan Smith – baritone sax

Discography

Albums

Instrumental Albums

See also

Notes

References

External links 
 
 The Dip on BandCamp
 The Dip on BandsInTown
 The Dip YouTube channel

American pop music groups
Musical groups established in 2013
Musical groups from Seattle
University of Washington alumni